Emmanuelle Gagliardi and Janette Husárová were the defending champions, but none competed this year.

Li Ting and Sun Tiantian won the title by defeating Michaëlla Krajicek and Henrieta Nagyová 6–3, 6–1 in the final.

Seeds
The top three seeds received a bye into the quarterfinals.

Draw

Draw

References
 Main Draw (WTA)

2005 Estoril Open